The West Indies women's cricket team toured New Zealand in February and March 2014. They played against New Zealand in three One Day Internationals and five Twenty20 Internationals, losing the ODI series 3–0 and losing the T20I series 4–0.

Squads

Tour Match: Canterbury v West Indies

WODI Series

1st ODI

2nd ODI

3rd ODI

WT20I Series

1st T20I

2nd T20I

3rd T20I

4th T20I

5th T20I

References

External links
West Indies Women tour of New Zealand 2013/14 from Cricinfo

International cricket competitions in 2014
2014 in women's cricket
Women's international cricket tours of New Zealand
West Indies women's cricket team tours